The 2010 Imola Superbike World Championship round was the twelfth round of the 2010 Superbike World Championship season. It took place on the weekend of September 24-26, 2009 at the Imola circuit.

Results

Superbike race 1 classification

Superbike race 2 classification

Supersport race classification

References
 Superbike Race 1
 Superbike Race 2
 Supersport Race

Imola Round
Imola Superbike